Cretihaliplus is a genus of beetles in the family Haliplidae, containing the following species:

 Cretihaliplus chifengensis Ren, Zhu & Lu, 1995
 Cretihaliplus sidaojingensis Ren, Zhu & Lu, 1995

References

Haliplidae